The 1995 Supercopa de España was a two-legged Spanish football match played on 24 August and 27 August 1995. It was contested by Deportivo La Coruña, who were Spanish Cup winners in 1994–95, and Real Madrid, who won the 1994–95 Spanish League. Deportivo won 5–1 on aggregate.

Match details

First leg

Second leg

References
 List of Super Cup Finals 1995 RSSSF.com

Supercopa de Espana Final
Supercopa de España
Supercopa de Espana 1995
Supercopa de Espana 1995